The 1976 AIAW National Small College Basketball Championship was the second annual tournament hosted by the Association for Intercollegiate Athletics for Women to determine the national champion of women's collegiate basketball among its small college members in the United States.

The tournament was held at Ashland College in Ashland, Ohio between March 23 and March 27, 1976. 

Berry defeated West Georgia in the championship game, 68–62, capturing the Vikings' first AIAW small college national title. 

Sixteen teams participated in a single-elimination tournament that additionally included a third-place final for the two teams that lost in the semifinal games.

Tournament bracket

See also
1976 AIAW National Large College Basketball Championship

References

AIAW women's basketball tournament
AIAW Small College
AIAW National Division I Basketball Championship
1976 in sports in Ohio
Women's sports in Ohio